USS Fort Wayne (ID 3786) was a Design 1016 freighter acquired by the U.S. Navy during the last year of World War I. She was assigned to carry cargo to Europe, after which she was decommissioned and sold by the U.S. Shipping Board. She then became the SS Fort Wayne, and was scrapped in Japan in 1934.

Constructed in Baltimore 

Fort Wayne (No. 3786), a 6245 gross register ton (12,260 tons displacement) freighter, was built in 1918 by Baltimore Drydock and Shipbuilding Co., Baltimore, Maryland; acquired by the Navy 27 December 1918; and commissioned as USS Fort Wayne (ID-3786) the same day.

World War I support 

The ship loaded general cargo and sailed from Baltimore 26 January 1919 for Gibraltar, with a refueling stop at the Azores. At Gibraltar Fort Wayne received orders to deliver a full load of cargo for the Italian government at La Spezzia, Italy, where she arrived in mid-February. Because of a shortage of cargo handling workers she was delayed there for almost a month and finally sailed for Norfolk, Virginia, arriving there on 20 April.

After refueling at the Azores the freighter had to return there in early April for repairs to her propeller.

Final decommissioning and subsequent history 

USS Fort Wayne was decommissioned at Norfolk, Virginia, 23 April 1919 and returned to the U.S. Shipping Board. SS Fort Wayne was sold by the Shipping Board to a commercial firm in 1929 and was scrapped in Japan in 1934.

References 

 
 S.S. Fort Wayne (American Freighter, 1918) Served as USS Fort Wayne (ID # 3786) in 1918-1919.

World War I auxiliary ships of the United States
Ships built in Baltimore
Cargo ships of the United States Navy
1918 ships
Design 1016 ships